The 7th IAAF World Indoor Championships in Athletics were held in the Green Dome Maebashi stadium in Maebashi, Japan from March 5 to March 7, 1999. It was the first time the Championships were staged outside Europe or North America. Primo Nebiolo, president of the IAAF, characterized the championships as "the greatest ever". There were a total number of 487 participating athletes from 115 countries.

Doping disqualifications
Four medalists were disqualified for doping; Rostislav Dimitrov of Bulgaria was stripped of the triple jump silver, Inger Miller of the USA was stripped of the 60 metre bronze, Vita Pavlysh of Ukraine was stripped of the shot put gold and Irina Korzhanenko of Russia was stripped of the shot put silver.

Results

Men

1 Rostislav Dimitrov of Bulgaria originally won  the silver medal, but was disqualified for doping.

Women

American sprinter Inger Miller won the bronze but failed a post-race drug test (excessive caffeine) and was stripped of the medal.
Irina Korzhanenko of Russia was stripped of the shot put silver.

Medal table

Participating nations

 (4)
 (1)
 (1)
 (1)
 (1)
 (1)
 (12)
 (6)
 (5)
 (1)
 (1)
 (2)
 (2)
 (1)
 (1)
 (1)
 (1)
 (1)
 (1)
 (1)
 (10)
 (2)
 (4)
 (1)
 (2)
 (10)
 (1)
 (1)
 (1)
 (9)
 (1)
 (10)
 (1)
 (1)
 (1)
 (1)
 (1)
 (1)
 (1)
 (1)
 (2)
 (1)
 (17)
 (1)
 (1)
 (24)
 (1)
 (24)
 (8)
 (1)
 (1)
 (1)
 (1)
 (1)
 (7)
 (3)
 (3)
 (2)
 (7)
 (15)
 (30)
 (4)
 (5)
 (1)
 (1)
 (1)
 (1)
 (1)
 (2)
 (1)
 (1)
 (1)
 (1)
 (1)
 (4)
 (1)
 (3)
 (2)
 (1)
 (3)
 (3)
 (8)
 (1)
 (1)
 (1)
 (20)
 (1)
 (1)
 (10)
 (26)
 (1)
 (1)
 (1)
 (1)
 (2)
 (8)
 (1)
 (2)
 (18)
 (1)
 (1)
 (4)
 (4)
 (1)
 (1)
 (1)
 (1)
 (1)
 (1)
 (7)
 (46)
 (1)
 (1)
 (1)
 (1)

See also
 1999 in athletics (track and field)

References

External links
1999 IAAF World Indoor Championships Official Website
Athletics Australia

 
World Indoor Championships
IAAF World Indoor Championships
World Athletics Indoor Championships
International athletics competitions hosted by Japan